The Indian Naval Air Squadron 314 (INAS 314) is a naval squadron of the Indian Navy based at Porbandar. The squadron was commissioned on 29 November 2019 by Vice Admiral MS Pawar.

This squadron is currently operational under the Western Naval Command.

History
INAS 314 was officially commissioned by Vice Admiral MS Pawar on 29 November 2019 at Porbandar. It operates Dornier 228 manufactured by HAL. This squadron is establish to the first responder in crucial area of North Arabian Sea. This is the sixth squadron of Dornier 228. The squadron is the first to operate 4 aircraft of newly ordered Dornier aircraft.

The squadron has been primarily tasked with maritime surveillance, search and rescue operations and to provide targeting data for weapon platforms. Indian Navy plans on inducting 12 new such aircraft.

See also
INAS 313
INAS 318

References

Indian Navy
Aircraft squadrons of the Indian Navy
Naval units and formations of India
Military units and formations established in 2019